The 1990–91 Cypriot Fourth Division was the 6th season of the Cypriot fourth-level football league. The championship was split into three geographical groups, representing the Districts of Cyprus. The winners were:
 Nicosia-Keryneia Group: AEK Kakopetrias
 Larnaca-Famagusta Group: Achyronas Liopetriou
 Limassol-Paphos Group: Kentro Neotitas Maroniton

The three winners were promoted to the 1991–92 Cypriot Third Division. Seven teams were relegated to regional leagues.

See also
 Cypriot Fourth Division
 1990–91 Cypriot First Division
 1990–91 Cypriot Cup

Cypriot Fourth Division seasons
Cyprus
1990–91 in Cypriot football